Fisherman's Wharf is a historic wharf in Monterey, California, United States. Used as an active wholesale fish market into the 1960s, the wharf eventually became a tourist attraction as commercial fishing tapered off in the area.

Fisherman's Wharf is technically known as The Old Fisherman's Wharf, to distinguish it from the current commercial wharf (known as Municipal Wharf #2).

History

Fisherman's Wharf was built by the Pacific Coast Steamship Company in 1870 for the loading and unloading of passengers and goods. The wharf was also used by other commercial operations, and the city of Monterey took ownership in 1913. The wharf was expanded through 1920.

In 1923, while an unusually large shipment of sardines was being loaded onto the S.S. San Antonio, bad weather caused the ship to lean on the wharf, and 132 feet of the wharf collapsed. When the wharf was reconstructed, it was extended by 750 feet.

Municipal Wharf II was constructed in 1926. After World War II, the sardine population in Monterey Bay collapsed. With the contraction of the fishing industry, Old Fisherman's Wharf reoriented its business focus toward tourism.

Current use

Fisherman's Wharf is lined with seafood restaurants ranging from casual, open-air clam bars, to formal indoor dining with views of the bay. Along with Cannery Row, Fisherman's Wharf is one of the few areas in Monterey that sells souvenirs, so the restaurants are interspersed with gift shops, jewelry stores, art galleries, and candy shops. Whale watching tours and fishing trips leave from the wharf, and sea lions often sleep on the pilings, buoys, and moored boats in the bay.

At the entrance to the wharf is Custom House Plaza, the historical center of Monterey. Here you will find the Custom House, the first government building in California and the location where the United States took Monterey from Mexico in 1846. The Monterey Maritime Museum is also located in Custom House Plaza, detailing both the maritime and cultural history of Monterey and the surrounding area. Many other historic buildings are located in this plaza. It is also the location of the last whalebone sidewalk in the United States.

Accessible almost exclusively to pedestrians, Fisherman's Wharf is located at the end of the Alvarado Mall, just west of the municipal wharf on Lighthouse Avenue. It is also on the Coastal Recreation Trail, providing pedestrian access to Cannery Row and Pacific Grove From Memorial Day to Labor Day the city of Monterey provides a free trolley service to Cannery Row and the Monterey Bay Aquarium. A favorite activity on the wharf, for both tourists and locals, is sailing on the Monterey Bay along Cannery Row.

See also
Old Fisherman's Grotto

References

External links
Official Monterey Fisherman's Wharf website

Buildings and structures in Monterey, California
Monterey Bay
Wharves in the United States
Landmarks in California
Tourist attractions in Monterey, California